Habronattus calcaratus is a species of jumping spider that can be found in the United States and Canada.

Subspecies
There are three recognized subspecies: H. c. agricola from the Great Plains (South Dakota to Texas); H. c. calcaratus from Florida; and H. c. maddisoni from the eastern U.S. and Canada.

References

Salticidae
Spiders of the United States
Spiders described in 1904
Taxa named by Nathan Banks